Ikaunieks (feminine: Ikauniece) is a Latvian toponymic surname, derived from several locations in Latvia named Ikaunieki. Individuals with the surname include:
Dāvis Ikaunieks (born 1994), Latvian footballer
Jānis Ikaunieks (1912–1969), Latvian astronomer 
Jānis Ikaunieks (born 1995), Latvian footballer

Latvian-language masculine surnames